Big Radio 3 or Big Radio - Treći program is a Bosnian local commercial radio station, broadcasting from Banja Luka, Bosnia and Herzegovina. This radio station broadcasts a variety of programs such as foreign pop music and local news. The owner of the radio station is the company BIG RADIO d.o.o. Banja Luka.

Estimated number of listeners of Big Radio 3 is around 203.988.

Frequencies
 Banja Luka

Programming 
Programming is mainly produced in Serbian language at one FM frequency (Banja Luka ) and it is available in the city of Banja Luka as well as in nearby municipalities Laktaši, Čelinac, Prnjavor, Bosanska Gradiška/Gradiška and Kotor Varoš. Syndicated mixshows from notable DJs including Armin van Buuren, Nicole Moudaber, John Digweed, and Tiësto air every day at 9:00pm local time.

See also 
 List of radio stations in Bosnia and Herzegovina
 Big Radio 2
 Radio A
 Pop FM
 RSG Radio

References

External links 
 www.bigradiobl.com
 www.bigportal.ba
 www.radiostanica.ba
 www.fmscan.org
 Communications Regulatory Agency of Bosnia and Herzegovina

Banja Luka
Radio stations established in 2006
Mass media in Banja Luka